Charlotte Anne Anneveld (born 30 December 1982, in Sydney, New South Wales) is an Australian cricket player.

In her overseas career, Anneveld played one day cricket for English teams Hampshire Women, Lancashire Women and  Kent Women.

References

Living people
1982 births
Australian women cricketers
Sydney Thunder (WBBL) cricketers